This is a list of medical schools in the Caribbean. Schools are listed in alphabetical order by country or territory, then by name. The list includes medical schools recognized by their local governments that award the Doctor of Medicine (MD) and/or Bachelor of Medicine, Bachelor of Surgery (MBBS) degrees.

All recognized medical schools are listed in the World Directory of Medical Schools (WDMS). Several agencies may also accredit Caribbean medical schools, as listed in the FAIMER Directory of Organizations that Recognize/Accredit Medical Schools (DORA).

Categories: Regional vs. Off-shore
Caribbean medical schools can be categorized as either "regional" or "offshore". Regional medical schools train students to practice in the country or region where the school is located. Offshore medical schools in the Caribbean primarily train students from the United States and Canada who intend to return home for residency and clinical practice after graduation. Most offshore medical schools are dual-campus programs: basic sciences are completed in the Caribbean, while clinical clerkships are completed at teaching hospitals in the United States, Canada, and the United Kingdom.

List of current Caribbean medical schools

See also
 Caribbean Accreditation Authority for Education in Medicine and other Health Professions
 Accreditation Commission of Colleges of Medicine
 World Directory of Medical Schools 
 International medical graduate
 Offshore medical school
 List of medical schools

References

External links
 World Directory of Medical Schools

Caribbean